The election of all 99 seats in the Tennessee House of Representatives occurred on November 3, 2020, concurrent with the Presidential, U.S. Senate, U.S. House, and State Senate elections.  

The Democratic Party retook the 90th district, where the incumbent John DeBerry had defected to become an independent. The Republican Party maintained their supermajority in the state house.

Predictions

Results summary

Close races
Seven races were decided by a margin of under 10%:

Results

Retirements
5 incumbents did not run for re-election in 2020. The incumbents are:

Republicans
District 3 Timothy Hill retired to run for Tennessee's 1st Congressional District
District 16 Bill Dunn
District 18 Martin Daniel
District 76 Andrew Holt
District 97 Jim Coley

Democrats
No democrats retired in 2020

Incumbents defeated

Republicans
District 6 James Van Huss lost to Tim Hicks
District 7 Matthew Hill lost to Rebecca Alexander
District 92 Thomas R. Tillis lost to Todd Warner

Democrats
District 15 Rick Staples lost to Sam McKenzie

Independents
District 90 John DeBerry lost to Torrey Harris (DeBerry originally ran as a Democrat and lost the nomination. He ran as an independent in the general election.)

Detailed results by State House district

District 1

Republican primary

General election

District 2

Republican primary

Democratic Primary

General election

District 3

Republican primary

General election

District 4

Republican primary

Democratic Primary

General election

District 5

Republican primary

General election

District 6

Republican primary

Democratic Primary

General election

District 7

Republican primary

General election

District 8

Republican primary

Democratic Primary

General election

District 9

Republican primary

General election

District 10

Republican primary

General election

District 11

Republican primary

General election

District 12

Republican primary

Democratic primary

General election

District 13

Democratic primary

Republican primary

General election

District 14

Republican primary

Democratic primary

General election

District 15

Democratic primary

General election

References 

Tennessee
House
Tennessee House of Representatives election elections